Robert Franz Tichy (born 30 September 1957 in Vienna) is an Austrian mathematician and professor at  Graz University of Technology. 

He studied mathematics at the University of Vienna and finished 1979 with a Ph.D. thesis on uniform distribution under the supervision of Edmund Hlawka. He received his habilitation at TU Wien in 1983.   Currently he is a professor at the Institute for Analysis and Number Theory at TU Graz.  Previous positions include head of the Department of Mathematics and  Dean of the Faculty of Mathematics, Physics and Geodesy at TU Graz, President of the Austrian Mathematical Society, and Member of the Board (Kuratorium) of the FWF, the Austrian Science Foundation.

His research deals with Number theory, Analysis and Actuarial mathematics, and in particular with number theoretic algorithms, digital expansions, diophantine problems, combinatorial and asymptotic analysis, quasi Monte Carlo methods and actuarial risk models. 
Among his contributions are results in discrepancy theory, a criterion (joint with Yuri Bilu) for the finiteness of the solution set of a separable diophantine equation, as well as investigations of graph theoretic indices and of combinatorial algorithms with analytic methods. 
He also investigated (with Istvan Berkes and Walter Philipp) pseudorandom properties of lacunary sequences. 

In the theory of equidistribution he solved (with Harald Niederreiter) an open problem of Donald Knuth's book The Art of Computer Programming, by showing that for any sequence  of distinct natural numbers  the sequence  is completely uniformly distributed for almost all real numbers ; as a corollary, for almost all real numbers  the sequence  is random in the sense of Knuth's definition R4.

Tichy is interested in the history of Alpinism and is also an avid climber. 

In 1985 he received the Prize of the Austrian Mathematical Society. Since 2004 he has been a Corresponding Member of the Austrian Academy of Sciences. In 2017 he received an honorary doctorate from the University of Debrecen.  He taught as a visiting professor at the University of Illinois at Urbana–Champaign and the Tata Institute of Fundamental Research. In 2017 he was a guest professor at Paris 7; in the winter semester 2020/21 he held the 
Morlet chair at the Centre International de Rencontres Mathématiques in Luminy.

References

Selected publications 
.
.
.
.
 .
.
 .
.
.

External links 

 Robert Tichy's home page at TU Graz
 
 Robert F. Tichy: 50 years - the unreasonable effectiveness of a number theorist (PDF; 350 kB)
 Number Theory - Diophantine Problems, Uniform Distribution and Applications. Festschrift in Honour of Robert F. Tichy’s 60th Birthday. Springer Verlag

20th-century Austrian mathematicians
21st-century Austrian mathematicians
1957 births
Living people
Corresponding Members of the Austrian Academy of Sciences
Academic staff of the Graz University of Technology